The Progressive Group for Independent Business (PGIB) is a membership-funded business and taxpayer association in Canada founded in 1992 with the goal of promoting the interests of their membership, which consists of small-business owners, entrepreneurs and taxpayers. The firm also offers lobbying services and full-service campaign consulting.  Its CEO is Craig Chandler.

Since the mid-1990s, the PGIB has claimed to have influenced the development of some of the policies of the Common Sense Revolution platform that elected Progressive Conservative Party of Ontario leader Mike Harris to provincial government. The PGIB also claims that in its 1995 campaign "Focus Federally for Reform" (FFR), it successfully restrained the Reform Party from creating a provincial party in Ontario, thereby splitting the right-wing provincial vote.  

In 1998, under the auspices of the PGIB, Chandler organized the "Unite the Right - Roots of Change" conference in Toronto, Ontario. The conference included social conservative delegates from the Reform and Progressive Conservative Parties.  It was criticized for also including representatives of the Christian Heritage Party of Canada, Confederation of Regions Party, Freedom Party of Ontario, Renaissance Canada and the Alliance for the Preservation of English in Canada. Attendees also included conservative commentators Michael Coren and Linda Leatherdale.

In 2003 the PGIB launched the "2cards.ca" initiative that called for a United Alternative. Chandler ran as the PGIB candidate in the Progressive Conservative leadership convention, 2003.  

In June 2009, Mark Dyrholm the group's National Vice President and a Calgary Chiropractor. Ran for the Leadership of the newly former Wildrose Alliance Party to succeed Paul Hinman in their 2009 Leadership Convention. In the end Dyrholm lost to Danielle Smith an Alberta journalist and broadcaster.

References

External links
Progressive Group for Independent Business Webpage

Conservatism in Canada
Political advocacy groups in Canada